Andrew Bond may also refer to:

Andy Bond (businessman) (born 1965), former Chief Executive Officer of Asda
Andrew Bond, founder of Bond Electraglide
Andrew Bond, father of James Bond and a character in SilverFin
Andrew Bond (cricketer) (born 1978), Australian cricketer
Andy Bond (footballer) (born 1986), English footballer